Crypsiprora is a genus of moths of the family Noctuidae.

Species
 Crypsiprora ophiodesma Meyrick, 1902
 Crypsiprora orthogramma Turner, 1936
 Crypsiprora peratoscia Hampson, 1926

References
 Crypsiprora at Markku Savela's Lepidoptera and Some Other Life Forms
 Natural History Museum Lepidoptera genus database

Calpinae
Moth genera